Olliver Smith (5 December 1898 – 17 July 1965) was a Norwegian modern pentathlete. He competed at the 1920 and 1924 Summer Olympics.

References

External links
 

1898 births
1965 deaths
Norwegian male modern pentathletes
Olympic modern pentathletes of Norway
Modern pentathletes at the 1920 Summer Olympics
Modern pentathletes at the 1924 Summer Olympics
Sportspeople from Oslo